Muguette Mary "Megs" Jenkins (21 April 1917 – 5 October 1998) was an English character actress who appeared in British films and television programmes.

Life and career
Jenkins was born in Birkenhead, Cheshire, the daughter of a construction engineer.

She originally trained to be a ballet dancer. Although born in England, she often played Welsh characters. She made her noticeable film debut in Millions Like Us (1943) as the Welsh room-mate and confidante of the main character (played by Patricia Roc). She went on to appear in such films as Green for Danger (1946), The History of Mr. Polly (1949), The Cruel Sea (1953), and Oliver! (1968). She played the housekeeper, Mrs. Grose, in two adaptations of Henry James's The Turn of the Screw: the film The Innocents (1961) and a 1974 television adaptation. She also frequently played comedic roles, and in later life was a regular in the sitcom Oh No It's Selwyn Froggitt, and the children's series Worzel Gummidge.

From 1933, Jenkins also had a long stage career, and appeared in several plays by Emlyn Williams including The Light of Heart in 1940. In 1953 she appeared in the long-running A Day by the Sea by N.C. Hunter. In 1956, she won the Clarence Derwent Award for Best Supporting performance in Arthur Miller's A View from the Bridge.

Megs Jenkins's 1943 marriage to George Routledge, a commando who had been a childhood classmate, and who renewed their acquaintance when he saw her name in a review, ended in divorce in 1959.

Filmography

Film

Television

 Jenny Meade (1951, TV film)
 Dark Summer (1951, TV film)
 The Human Jungle (1964, Episode, "Conscience on a Rack") – Dr Murphy
 Gideon's Way (1965, Episode, "The Wall") – Landlord's wife
 Weavers Green (1966, TV serial)
 David Copperfield (1969, TV film)
 The Befrienders (1970, TV film) – Janet
 Jane Eyre (1973, TV Serial) – Mrs. Fairfax
 Orson Welles Great Mysteries (1973, TV series, Series 1, episode 11: 'The Monkey's Paw') - Mrs. White
 Crown Court (1974, Episode, "Vermin") – Dr. Bridget Walker
 The Turn of the Screw (1974, TV film) – Mrs. Grose
 Oh No It's Selwyn Froggitt (1976–77) – Mrs Froggitt
 Worzel Gummidge (1979–80) Mrs Braithwaite
 Young at Heart (1980–1982, TV sitcom) – Ethel Collyer
 A Woman of Substance (1985 TV film) – Mrs. Turner

References

External links

 

  Stage performances on the Theatre Archive, University of Bristol

1917 births
1998 deaths
English film actresses
English television actresses
People from Birkenhead
20th-century English actresses